The following is a list of fish and wildlife areas in the state of Indiana.

See also
 Indiana Department of Natural Resources
 List of Indiana state parks
 List of Indiana state lakes
 List of Indiana state forests

References

Geography of Indiana